This is a list of Turkish football transfers for the 2007–08 season. Only moves from the Süper Lig are listed.

Summer transfer window

May

June

July

August

September

Winter transfer window

December

January

References

Turkey
Transfers
Turkey
2007-08